Canada was a founding member of the United Nations, and was an original signatory of the Declaration by United Nations. At the signing of the Declaration by United Nations, Canada was one of four Dominions of the British Empire present, alongside Australia, New Zealand, and the Union of South Africa. In 1945, Canada was present at the United Nations Conference on International Organization and signed the Charter of the United Nations. McGill University professor John Peters Humphrey was the principal author of the first draft of the Universal Declaration of Human Rights.

Canada has served on the United Nations Security Council (UNSC) as a non-permanent member 8 times, with the most recent being in 2000. For its first 2 terms in the UNSC, Canada took the Commonwealth seat on the council, but since 1967, Canada has run for the Western European and Others Group seat. Canada is a member of Uniting for Consensus, a group that opposes the G4 nations' bids for permanent seats on the Security Council.

During the Suez Crisis, Canadian delegation to the United Nations was instrumental in the creation of the United Nations Emergency Force (UNEF) to end the situation. In 1957, then-Secretary of State for External Affairs Lester B. Pearson was awarded the Nobel Peace Prize for his role in the creation of the UNEF.

History 

Canada was an original member of the United Nations, having previously served in the League of Nations prior to its dissolution. John Peters Humphrey established the Division for Human Rights in the UN Secretariat. Humphrey was also on the Drafting Committee of the International Bill of Rights. The Committee gave the Division for Human Rights the task of creating the first draft of the Bill of Rights, with Humphrey being the preliminary drafter of the document. Humphrey remained a champion of the Bill of Rights until its adoption by approval of the UN General Assembly in 1948.
 
In 1947, Canada played an important role in the United Nations Special Committee on Palestine (UNSCOP). Canada was one of the 33 countries that voted in favour of the 1947 UN partition resolution, which led to the establishment of the State of Israel despite heavy pressure from the United Kingdom on the Commonwealth of Nations

Secretary of State for External Affairs Lester B. Pearson, having served as UN General Assembly President in 1952/53, proposed the concept of UN peacekeeping forces as a means of dealing with the Suez Crisis. He was awarded a Nobel Peace Prize for his efforts and the establishment of the United Nations Emergency Force (UNEF).

Actions as a UN Member State

Peacekeeping

The success of the Suez peacekeeping mission led Canadians to embrace peacekeeping as a suitable role for a middle-sized country, looking for a role, and having high regards for the United Nations.  This led to sending a peacekeeping force to Cyprus in 1964, when two NATO members, Greece and Turkey were at swords' point over ethnic violence in the historic British colony. The Canadians left in 1993 after 28 were killed and many wounded in the operation. Peacekeeping help was needed in the Belgian Congo in 1960-64, after Belgium pulled out. There were numerous other small interventions.  Canada took a central role in the International Control Commission (ICC), which tried to broker peace in Vietnam in the 1960s. In 1993 violent misbehavior by Canadian peacekeeping forces in Somalia shocked the nation.

Canada and the Security Council
Canada has served in the UNSC for 12 years, thus ranking in the top ten of non-permanent members. As of 2015, it shares the fourth place in the list of non-permanent members serving on the Council by length with Italy. This places Canada behind Brazil and Japan (first place), Argentina (second place), and Colombia, India, and Pakistan (third place). Canada was elected for the following six terms: 1948–49, 1958–59, 1967–68, 1977–78, 1989–90, and 1999–2000 - once every decade. It lost its bid for a seat in the 2010 Security Council elections, to Germany and Portugal, and in the 2020 Security Council elections, to Ireland and Norway.

National Film Board of Canada
The National Film Board of Canada (NFB), Canada's state film producer, has produced several works about or on behalf of the U.N. The first, the 1944 short film U.N.R.R.A. presents In the Wake of the Armies ... focused the work of the United Nations Relief and Rehabilitation Administration. The 1945 film Now — The Peace, on the formation of the U.N. at the Dumbarton Oaks Conference, was produced by the NFB at the suggestion of Archibald MacLeish, then-Assistant Secretary of State for Public Affairs for the U.S. government.

Proposed headquarters site(s) 

A site on Navy Island which straddles the U.S.-Canada border was considered as potential site for the UN Headquarters. As well as a subsequent proposals following the Iraq invasion to relocate to Montreal in the Canadian province of Quebec.

See also

Permanent Representative of Canada to the United Nations
United Nations Association in Canada
List of Canadian peacekeeping missions

References

Citations

Sources

Further reading

 
Foreign relations of Canada